Colm Mulholland is an Irish former Gaelic footballer who played in the 1958 All-Ireland Final. He was with his Lavey teammate Tommy Doherty for the game. He was 13 years a county player. He was the brother-in-law of Sean O'Connell. He got himself a goal against Armagh in the 1955 Ulster Senior semi-final.

References

External links
 The Day Colm Mulholland met Packie McGarty

Derry inter-county Gaelic footballers
Year of birth missing
Place of birth missing
Possibly living people